Zamboanga del Norte's 1st congressional district is one of the three congressional districts of the Philippines in the province of Zamboanga del Norte. It has been represented in the House of Representatives since 1987. The district encompasses the northernmost portion of the province and consists of the city of Dapitan and adjacent municipalities of La Libertad, Mutia, Piñan, Polanco, Rizal, Sergio Osmeña Sr. and Sibutad. It is currently vacant in the 19th Congress since July 21, 2022, when Romeo Jalosjos Jr. of the Nacionalista Party (NP) was removed from office due to a status quo ante order issued by the Supreme Court of the Philippines.

Representation history

Notes

Election results

2022

2019

2016

2013

2010

See also
Legislative districts of Zamboanga del Norte

References

Congressional districts of the Philippines
Politics of Zamboanga del Norte
1987 establishments in the Philippines
Congressional districts of Zamboanga Peninsula
Constituencies established in 1987